Coccidiascus is a genus of fungi in the family Eremotheciaceae.

References

External links
Index Fungorum

Saccharomycetes